Bedfield is a village and civil parish in the Mid Suffolk district of Suffolk, England.

References 

Villages in Suffolk
Mid Suffolk District
Civil parishes in Suffolk